Arhopala antharita is a butterfly in the family Lycaenidae. It was described by Henley Grose-Smith in 1894. It is found in New Guinea.

Subspecies
A. a. antharita (West Irian: Humboldt Bay)
A. a. hyacinthus (Röber, 1931) (West Irian: Eilanden R., Oetakwa R.)

References

Arhopala
Butterflies described in 1894
Taxa named by Henley Grose-Smith
Butterflies of Oceania